Tommy Goulden (born 30 June 1981) is an English former professional rugby league footballer who played in the 2000s and 2010s. He played at club level for the Leigh Miners Rangers, the Rochdale Hornets, Oldham and the Leigh Centurions.

Playing career
Goulden began his career as an amateur with the Leigh Miners Rangers before turning professional with the Rochdale Hornets in 2005. He played two seasons apiece for the Rochdale Hornets and later Oldham before joining hometown club the Leigh Centurions before the start of the 2010 season.

Goulden was a regular try scorer during his career and featured in Leigh's 20-16 Northern Rail Cup Final victory over Halifax in 2011.

References 
Leigh Centurions profile

1981 births
Living people
English rugby league players
Leigh Leopards players
Oldham R.L.F.C. players
Rochdale Hornets players
Rugby league second-rows